The University of Bielsko-Biała (Polish Akademia Techniczno-Humanistyczna w Bielsku-Białej (ATH in the logo and website) is a university in Bielsko-Biała, Poland, established in 2001. It was previously part of the Technical University of Łódź.

History
The University of Bielsko-Biała was founded in October 2001 as an independent government academic institution. Previously it was a branch of Łódź University of Technology, founded in 1969 at the request of the Bielsko-Biała industrial region.

Student life
At present there are 10,000 students in the university. The machine-building, electrical and textile industries are traditional for the region, so the main courses of education have been long-established. As the economy changed, the university followed, developing new faculties such as Management, Environmental Protection, Information Sciences and Humanities.

The university employs an experienced academic staff: professors and other experts from the region, who deliver lectures and carry out research. The number of the academic staff is growing constantly. At present, it comprises about 350 people, including about 160 professors and doctors.

Academics
The main educational and scientific core of the college consists of:

Faculty of Mechanical Engineering and Information Sciences 
Faculty of Textile Engineering and Environmental Protection
Faculty of Management and Information Sciences
Faculty of Humanities and Social Sciences
Faculty of Health Sciences

There are several inter-faculty units, including the Department of Foreign Languages, the Department of Physical Education and Sport, the Main Library and Centre of Postgraduate Studies and Vocational Training.

Levels of study 
Licentiate (B.A. or B.Sc.)
Master of Arts (M.A.) and Master of Sciences (M.Sc.)
Advanced/postgraduate study
Doctorate
Higher/post doctorate (habilitatus)

Ranking 
In a survey conducted by the Polish edition of Newsweek in 2008, University of Bielsko-Biała was selected as the fifth best among all Polish universities.

Region
The university is in a city that can be easily reached. Bielsko is in equal distance from Prague, Warsaw, and Vienna. It's a very attractive tourist region. Nice atmosphere, friendly attitude towards students, chance to train in interesting companies. It is characteristic of the region that many foreign companies have their headquarters in the neighborhood of Bielsko-Biała. There are also many foreigners who work in the region. These students who can possibly take up a job in Poland or branch offices of foreign concerns can undergo such training here.

See also
 List of colleges and universities
 Bielsko-Biała

References

External links
 University of Bielsko-Biała Website. 

Universities and colleges in Poland
University of Bielsko-Biala
Engineering universities and colleges in Poland
Universities and colleges in Silesian Voivodeship